Moosomin is a provincial electoral district for the Legislative Assembly of Saskatchewan, Canada. Located in southeastern Saskatchewan, this constituency was one of 25 created for the 1st Saskatchewan general election in 1905.

Formerly represented by speaker Don Toth, it is arguably one of the most conservative ridings in the province, having been in the hands of a centre-right party without interruption since 1975. It has never elected a member of the CCF or NDP, though the NDP came within 51 votes of winning it during its 1991 landslide.

The largest centre in the constituency is the town of Moosomin. Other towns in the district include Grenfell, Kipling, Montmartre, Broadview, Whitewood, Rocanville and Wolseley.

Members of the Legislative Assembly

Election results

|-

 
|NDP
|Carol Morin
|align="right"|1,244
|align="right"|19.93%
|align="right"|-1.42

|- bgcolor="white"
!align="left" colspan=3|Total
!align="right"|6,242
!align="right"|100.00%
!align="right"|

|-

 
|NDP
|Virginia Healey
|align="right"|1,506
|align="right"|21.35%
|align="right"|-9.49

|- bgcolor="white"
!align="left" colspan=3|Total
!align="right"|7,053
!align="right"|100.00%
!align="right"|

|-

 
|NDP
|John M. McCormick
|align="right"|1,604
|align="right"|20.53%
|align="right"|-11.54

|- bgcolor="white"
!align="left" colspan=3|Total
!align="right"|7,812
!align="right"|100.00%
!align="right"|

|-
 
| style="width: 130px"|Progressive Conservative
|Don Toth
|align="right"|3,314
|align="right"|41.81%
|align="right"|+1.39
 
|NDP
|Glen Gatin
|align="right"|2,542
|align="right"|32.07%
|align="right"|-7.67

|- bgcolor="white"
!align="left" colspan=3|Total
!align="right"|7,926
!align="right"|100.00%
!align="right"|

|-
 
| style="width: 130px"|Progressive Conservative
|Don Toth
|align="right"|3,005
|align="right"|40.42%
|align="right"|-19.80
 
|NDP
|Mary McGuire
|align="right"|2,954
|align="right"|39.74%
|align="right"|+8.09

|- bgcolor="white"
!align="left" colspan=3|Total
!align="right"|7,434
!align="right"|100.00%
!align="right"|

|-
 
| style="width: 130px"|Progressive Conservative
|Don Toth
|align="right"|4,622
|align="right"|60.22%
|align="right"|+9.44
 
|NDP
|William F. Sauter
|align="right"|2,429
|align="right"|31.65%
|align="right"|+1.46

|- bgcolor="white"
!align="left" colspan=3|Total
!align="right"|7,675
!align="right"|100.00%
!align="right"|

|-
 
| style="width: 130px"|Progressive Conservative
|Larry Birkbeck
|align="right"|4,165
|align="right"|50.78%
|align="right"|+8.50
 
|NDP
|Fred A. Easton
|align="right"|2,476
|align="right"|30.19%
|align="right"|-2.77

|- bgcolor="white"
!align="left" colspan=3|Total
!align="right"|8,202
!align="right"|100.00%
!align="right"|

|-
 
| style="width: 130px"|Progressive Conservative
|Larry Birkbeck
|align="right"|3,353
|align="right"|42.28%
|align="right"|+4.54
 
|NDP
|Fred A. Easton
|align="right"|2,614
|align="right"|32.96%
|align="right"|+6.86

|- bgcolor="white"
!align="left" colspan=3|Total
!align="right"|7,931
!align="right"|100.00%
!align="right"|

|-
 
| style="width: 130px"|Progressive Conservative
|Larry Birkbeck
|align="right"|3,018
|align="right"|37.74%
|align="right"|-

 
|NDP
|Fred A. Easton
|align="right"|2,087
|align="right"|26.10%
|align="right"|-22.10
|- bgcolor="white"
!align="left" colspan=3|Total
!align="right"|7,996
!align="right"|100.00%
!align="right"|

|-

 
|NDP
|Edward B. Shillington
|align="right"|3,724
|align="right"|48.20%
|align="right"|+16.53
|- bgcolor="white"
!align="left" colspan=3|Total
!align="right"|7,727
!align="right"|100.00%
!align="right"|

|-

 
|NDP
|William F. Goodwin
|align="right"|2,435
|align="right"|31.67%
|align="right"|-2.48
 
|Progressive Conservative
|Andrew E. Bruce
|align="right"|1,956
|align="right"|25.44%
|align="right"|-3.70
|- bgcolor="white"
!align="left" colspan=3|Total
!align="right"|7,688
!align="right"|100.00%
!align="right"|

|-

 
|CCF
|William F. Goodwin
|align="right"|2,821
|align="right"|34.15%
|align="right"|-6.53
 
|Progressive Conservative
|Andrew E. Bruce
|align="right"|2,407
|align="right"|29.14%
|align="right"|-
|- bgcolor="white"
!align="left" colspan=3|Total
!align="right"|8,261
!align="right"|100.00%
!align="right"|

|-

 
|CCF
|William F. Goodwin
|align="right"|3,102
|align="right"|40.68%
|align="right"|+11.88
|- bgcolor="white"
!align="left" colspan=3|Total
!align="right"|7,625
!align="right"|100.00%
!align="right"|

|-

 
|CCF
|Edwin Nystrom
|align="right"|2,328
|align="right"|28.80%
|align="right"|-1.72

 
|Progressive Conservative
|Verlie McDonald
|align="right"|1,212
|align="right"|14.99%
|align="right"|-
|- bgcolor="white"
!align="left" colspan=3|Total
!align="right"|8,083
!align="right"|100.00%
!align="right"|

|-

 
|CCF
|Alfred S. Swanson
|align="right"|2,527
|align="right"|30.52%
|align="right"|-15.87

|- bgcolor="white"
!align="left" colspan=3|Total
!align="right"|8,279
!align="right"|100.00%
!align="right"|

|-

 
|CCF
|Edwin Nystrom
|align="right"|4,014
|align="right"|46.39%
|align="right"|+6.80
|- bgcolor="white"
!align="left" colspan=3|Total
!align="right"|8,653
!align="right"|100.00%
!align="right"|

 
|CCF
|Ivan Burden
|align="right"|3,442
|align="right"|39.59%
|align="right"|-6.65
|- bgcolor="white"
!align="left" colspan=3|Total
!align="right"|8,693
!align="right"|100.00%
!align="right"|

|-

 
|CCF
|David A. Cunningham
|align="right"|3,324
|align="right"|46.24%
|align="right"|-
|- bgcolor="white"
!align="left" colspan=3|Total
!align="right"|7,189
!align="right"|100.00%
!align="right"|

|-

 
|Conservative
|Percy S. George
|align="right"|2,528
|align="right"|31.11%
|align="right"|-8.00

|- bgcolor="white"
!align="left" colspan=3|Total
!align="right"|8,126
!align="right"|100.00%
!align="right"|

|-

 
|Conservative
|Frederick Dennis Munroe
|align="right"|2,465
|align="right"|39.11%
|align="right"|-

|Farmer-Labour
|John Frederick Herman
|align="right"|1,025
|align="right"|16.27%
|align="right"|–
|- bgcolor="white"
!align="left" colspan=3|Total
!align="right"|6,302
!align="right"|100.00%
!align="right"|

|-
 
| style="width: 130px"|Conservative
|Frederick Dennis Munroe
|align="right"|Acclaimed
|align="right"|100.00%
|- bgcolor="white"
!align="left" colspan=3|Total
!align="right"|Acclamation
!align="right"|

|-
 
| style="width: 130px"|Conservative
|Frederick Dennis Munroe
|align="right"|2,361
|align="right"|54.49%
|align="right"|-

|- bgcolor="white"
!align="left" colspan=3|Total
!align="right"|4,333
!align="right"|100.00
!align="right"|

|-

| style="width: 130px"|Independent
|John Louis Salkeld
|align="right"|1,888
|align="right"|52.68%
|align="right"|+1.72

|- bgcolor="white"
!align="left" colspan=3|Total
!align="right"|3,584
!align="right"|100.00
!align="right"|

|-
 
| style="width: 130px"|Conservative
|John Louis Salkeld
|align="right"|1,892
|align="right"|50.96%
|align="right"|-2.06

|- bgcolor="white"
!align="left" colspan=3|Total
!align="right"|3,713
!align="right"|100.00
!align="right"|

|-
 
| style="width: 130px"|Conservative
|John Louis Salkeld
|align="right"|1,921
|align="right"|53.02%
|align="right"|+9.75

|- bgcolor="white"
!align="left" colspan=3|Total
!align="right"|3,623
!align="right"|100.00
!align="right"|

|-

 
|Conservative
|Edward Lindsey Elwood
|align="right"|874
|align="right"|43.27%
|align="right"|-5.15
|- bgcolor="white"
!align="left" colspan=3|Total
!align="right"|2,020
!align="right"|100.00
!align="right"|

|-

 
|Provincial Rights
|Daniel David Ellis
|align="right"|963
|align="right"|48.42%
|align="right"|-2.58
|- bgcolor="white"
!align="left" colspan=3|Total
!align="right"|1,989
!align="right"|100.00
!align="right"|

|-
 
| style="width: 130px"|Provincial Rights
|Daniel David Ellis
|align="right"|915
|align="right"|51.00%
|align="right"|–

|- bgcolor="white"
!align="left" colspan=3|Total
!align="right"|1,794
!align="right"|100.00
!align="right"|

History

Members of the Legislative Assembly – Moosomin

See also 
Moosomin – Northwest Territories territorial electoral district (1870–1905).

References

External links 
Website of the Legislative Assembly of Saskatchewan
Saskatchewan Archives Board – Saskatchewan Election Results By Electoral Division

Saskatchewan provincial electoral districts